Holepyris sylvanidis, is a species of hymenopteran parasitoid in the family Bethylidae. It parasitizes pests of stored products. Its hosts include the confused flour beetle (preferred host), red flour beetle, sawtoothed grain beetle, merchant grain beetle, and rusty grain beetle.

References

Chrysidoidea